The 58th Academy of Country Music Awards will be held on May 11, 2023 in Frisco, Texas at the Ford Center. A host has yet to be announced for the ceremony.

Background 
On July 19, 2022, Prime Video and the ACM announced they would be moving the awards show to Frisco, Texas, at the Ford Center, which is a practice facility for the Dallas Cowboys. This marks the second time they have broadcast from the state since the 50th ceremony in 2015.

Category updates 
On December 1, 2022 the Academy announced it would be changing some of the awards categories. The Entertainer of the Year award would increase from five nominees to seven nominees. The Songwriter of the Year award would be separated into: Songwriter, described as an individual known predominantly as a songwriter and does not serve as the primary artist; and Artist-Songwriter, described as an individual known both as an artist and a songwriter who was the main recording artist on at least one song that charted in the top 20 on Billboard's Hot Country Songs or Mediabase Country charts during the eligibility period. Lastly, Video of the Year would be renamed as Visual Media of the Year, as to include other forms of media.

References 

Academy of Country Music Awards
Academy of Country Music Awards
Academy of Country Music Awards
2023 in Texas
Academy of Country Music Awards